MicroRNA 34a (miR-34a) is a MicroRNA that in humans is encoded by the MIR34A gene.

Function 
microRNAs (miRNAs) are short (20-24 nt) non-coding RNAs that are involved in post-transcriptional regulation of gene expression in multicellular organisms by affecting both the stability and translation of mRNAs. miRNAs are transcribed by RNA polymerase II as part of capped and polyadenylated primary transcripts (pri-miRNAs) that can be either protein-coding or non-coding. 

The primary transcript is cleaved by the Drosha ribonuclease III enzyme to produce an approximately 70-nt stem-loop precursor miRNA (pre-miRNA), which is further cleaved by the cytoplasmic Dicer ribonuclease to generate the mature miRNA and antisense miRNA star (miRNA*) products. 

The mature miRNA is incorporated into a RNA-induced silencing complex (RISC), which recognizes target mRNAs through imperfect base pairing with the miRNA and most commonly results in translational inhibition or destabilization of the target mRNA. The RefSeq represents the predicted microRNA stem-loop.

Clinical relevance 
miR-34a suppresses the gene expression of the NAMPT gene which encodes the nicotinamide phosphoribosyltransferase (Nampt) enzyme which is the rate-limiting enzyme in the nicotinamide adenine dinucleotide (NAD) salvage pathway, resulting in reduced levels of NAD. miR-34a suppression of NAMPT gene expression also reduces levels of sirtuin 1. Aging and obesity increases levels of miR-34a. The pro-inflammatory transcription factor  NF-κB (increasingly expressed with obesity and aging) increases miR-34a expression by binding to its promoter region. Inhibition of miR-34a in diet-induced obese mice restored levels of NAMPT and NAD, reducing inflammation and improving glucose tolerance.

miR-34a represses the translation of sirtuin 1 (SIRT1) in liver by binding to the 3′-UTR region of SIRT1 messenger RNA, contributing to metabolic syndrome Downregulation of SIRT1 by miR-34a promotes cellular senescence and inflammation in vascular smooth muscle cells of old mice, similar to reduced SIRT1 in vascular smooth muscle cells in humans. Impaired endothelial-dependent vasorelaxation caused by miR-34a can be ameliorated by SIRT1 overexpression.

References

Further reading